Ilya Andreyevich Kalachyov (born 18 January 2000) is a Russian football player who plays for Isloch Minsk Raion in Belarus.

Club career
He made his debut in the Russian Football National League for FC Tom Tomsk on 4 October 2020 in a game against FC Torpedo Moscow.

References

External links
 Profile by Russian Football National League
 
 

2000 births
Sportspeople from Samara, Russia
Living people
Russian footballers
Russia youth international footballers
Association football defenders
FC Dynamo Moscow reserves players
FC Tom Tomsk players
FC Neftekhimik Nizhnekamsk players
FC Olimp-Dolgoprudny players
FC Isloch Minsk Raion players
Russian First League players
Russian Second League players
Belarusian Premier League players
Russian expatriate footballers
Expatriate footballers in Belarus
Russian expatriate sportspeople in Belarus